BSCI may refer to:
 Business Social Compliance Initiative, a supplychain monitoring certification (BSCI)
 Cisco Career Certifications, Building Scalable Cisco Internetworks (BSCI)
 Broad-Spectrum Chemokine Inhibitor (BSCI), a class of anti-inflammatory drug
 Boston Scientific, a Fortune 500 medical device company